Brian Chapman (born February 10, 1968) is a Canadian former professional ice hockey defenceman. He was drafted 74th overall by the Hartford Whalers in the 1986 NHL Entry Draft. He played three games for the Whalers in the NHL during the 1990-91 season. He received the 2000-01 Ironman Award while playing for the Manitoba Moose.

Chapman was born  in Brockville, Ontario.

Career Statistics

References

External links

1968 births
Living people
Belleville Bulls players
Binghamton Whalers players
Canadian ice hockey defencemen
Hartford Whalers draft picks
Hartford Whalers players
Ice hockey people from Ontario
Long Beach Ice Dogs (IHL) players
Manitoba Moose players
Phoenix Roadrunners (IHL) players
Rochester Americans players
Sportspeople from Brockville
Springfield Falcons players
Springfield Indians players
Vancouver Canucks scouts